Paul Slythe (born 1974), is a male former international athlete who competed for England.

Athletics career
He represented England and won a silver medal in the 4 x 400 metres relay event, at the 1998 Commonwealth Games in Kuala Lumpur, Malaysia. The other team members consisted of Solomon Wariso, Mark Richardson, Jared Deacon, Sean Baldock and Mark Hylton.

References

1974 births
Living people
English male sprinters
Commonwealth Games medallists in athletics
Commonwealth Games silver medallists for England
Athletes (track and field) at the 1998 Commonwealth Games
Medallists at the 1998 Commonwealth Games